The Treaty of Alliance may refer to:
Treaty of Alliance (1778) between France and the United States
Treaty of Alliance (1960) between Cyprus, Greece and Turkey